Anne Tuomanen (born 15 April 1987) is a Finnish retired ice hockey winger, who played with the Finnish national team and fifteen seasons in the Naisten Liiga. She last served as captain for Ilves Naiset of the Naisten Liiga during the 2018–19 season. She was a member of the bronze medal-winning Finnish team at the 2011 IIHF Women's World Championship and the silver medal-winning team at the 2011 Winter Universiade In total, Tuomanen represented Finland in 76 international matches, including at the 2013 IIHF Women's World Championship and at the 2011 MLP Nations Cup.

Tuomanen played in the Naisten SM-sarja (renamed Naisten Liiga in 2017) with the Jyväskylän Hockey Cats of the during 2002–2007, HPK Kiekkonaiset during 2009–2011 and 2015–16, and the Tampereen Ilves Naiset during 2011–2015 and from 2016 until her retirement in 2019. Over the course of her career, she played more than 350 Naisten Liiga regular season games and skated in 75 playoff games. She won the Finnish Championship in 2011 with HPK, the inaugural recipients of the Aurora Borealis Cup, won three Finnish Championship silver and two Finnish Championship bronze medals, and was named to the 2010–11 Naisten Liiga All-Star Team.

References 
Content in this article is translated from the existing Finnish Wikipedia article at :fi:Anne Tuomanen; see its history for attribution.

External links
 

1987 births
Living people
People from Jyväskylä
Finnish women's ice hockey forwards
Ilves Naiset players
HPK Kiekkonaiset players
JYP Jyväskylä Naiset players
Universiade medalists in ice hockey
Universiade silver medalists for Finland
Competitors at the 2011 Winter Universiade